The Amarillo Gassers were a West Texas League (1922) and Panhandle-Pecos Valley League (1923) baseball team based in Amarillo, Texas, United States. They won the 1922 West Texas League championship under manager Jack Meanor, beating the Clovis Buzzers five games to one. They were on pace to finish first in 1923, however the Panhandle-Pecos League folded before the end of the season.

References

Baseball teams established in 1922
Baseball teams disestablished in 1923
Defunct minor league baseball teams
Defunct baseball teams in Texas
1922 establishments in Texas
1923 disestablishments in Texas
Sports in Amarillo, Texas